Tivat Airport  is an international airport serving the Montenegrin coastal town of Tivat and the surrounding region.

It is the busier of two international airports in Montenegro, the other being Podgorica Airport. Traffic at the airport follows the highly seasonal nature of the tourism industry in coastal Montenegro, with 80% of the total volume of passengers being handled during the peak season (May–September).

Overview 
The sole runway of the airport ends just  from the coastline of the Bay of Kotor.

Tivat Airport is assigned 4D classification by ICAO, airspace class D, and is noted for its challenging approach and landing procedures. Landing at Tivat is considered demanding due to the hilly terrain surrounding the valley in which the airport is situated, and strong prevailing crosswinds. Runway 32 approach requires a descent into the valley of Tivatsko polje, and a 20° turn for runway alignment just before landing. Runway 14 approach is even more challenging, because of the circle-to-land maneuver executed in the dramatic scenery surrounding the Bay of Kotor. It is known among pilots as the European Kai Tak because of its tricky approach and landing procedures, and also can be compared to Madeira Airport. Passengers landing at Tivat have views of the bay, the surrounding mountains and a low flyby over Porto Montenegro luxury yacht marina. The airport is commonly visited by plane spotters, as the end of the runway is easily accessible and offers unobstructed views of takeoffs and landings, with a mountain backdrop.

Year-round services from the airport include Belgrade and Moscow; however, more than 80% of the traffic is concentrated in the summer period, with the introduction of seasonal and charter flights. With the opening of Porto Montenegro and the introduction of other high-end tourist services, the airport increasingly caters to business jets.

Adriatic Highway (E65/E80) passes right by the passenger terminal, making the airport easily accessible from the entire northern part of Montenegrin coast.

History 
The airport in Tivat was opened on 30 May 1957, as a small airport with a single grass runway (1200 m × 80 m) a small apron (30 m × 30 m) and a terminal building complete with control tower. From 1957 to 1968, activity at the airport consisted mostly of domestic passenger traffic to Belgrade, Zagreb and Skopje, with JAT Douglas DC-3 and Ilyushin Il-14 aircraft.

From 1968 to 1971, the airport underwent expansion and modernization. It was reopened on 25 September 1971 with an asphalt runway (2500 m × 45 m), larger apron (450 m × 70 m), extended taxiways, and completely new passenger terminal and control tower. After the 1979 earthquake, the airport was once again refurbished. Notably, the apron was expanded (460 m × 91.5 m) and taxiways widened, so the airport could handle wide-body aircraft.

On 23 April 2003, the ownership of the airport was transferred from Jat Airways to "Airports of Montenegro" public company, owned by the government of Montenegro. Since then, the airport was once again modernized and refurbished, with a reconstructed passenger terminal opening on 3 June 2006. In October 2007, South Korea made a government donation valued at $1 million for a new airport equipment ranging from cargo loaders to flight information display system. Further reforms came in 2008 when several old types of passenger aircraft such as the Ilyushin Il-86 were permanently banned from flying to Tivat and subsequently redirected to Podgorica Airport due to noise abatement.

However, as passenger traffic in the mid-2010s approached the one-million mark, and strong growth continues, the passenger terminal was a bottleneck in peak summer months. Thus, a new passenger terminal was planned at Tivat Airport, along with a further expansion of airport facilities.

In December 2018, PM Duško Marković opened the newly built Terminal 2 at Tivat Airport – the first investment since 2006, when the existing airport building was built. Marković used this opportunity to point out that he sees the cooperation between the Government and the Management of Airports as an example to be followed by others in Montenegro.

Airlines and destinations 

Below is a list of scheduled services throughout all seasons from Tivat Airport according to the Montenegrin Airports Authority:

Statistics

Busiest routes

See also 
 Aeronautical Information Publication

References

External links 

 
 
 
 

Airports in Montenegro
Airports established in 1971
Tivat
1971 establishments in Yugoslavia